LTB may refer to:

 Landlord and Tenant Board, an Ontario tribunal for settling disputes between landlords and residential tenants
 Latent tuberculosis, medical condition
 Lateral-torsional buckling, mode of mechanical deformation
 Leader Training Brigade, part of the US Army's basic training organization
 Ligerz-Tessenberg-Bahn, a funicular in Switzerland
 London Tourist Board, responsible for promotion of tourism in London
 London Trained Bands, organized militia in London from 1559 to 1794
 London Transport Board, responsible for public transport in London from 1963 to 1969
 LTB dusts, solution to Einstein's field equations
 Lymphotoxin beta, human protein